Przewodnik may refer to:
Przewodnik, Kuyavian-Pomeranian Voivodeship, a village in north-central Poland
Przewodnik, one of the ranks in Polish Scouting